Too Hot to Handle is a 1977 exploitation film directed by directed by Don Schain and starring Cheri Caffaro, Aharon Ipalé, Corinne Calvet and Vic Diaz. The plot concerns about the adventures of hitwoman Samantha Fox in the Philippines.  The film is also billed as She's Too Hot to Handle.

Plot
Sexy Cheri Caffaro (Samantha Fox) engages in secret agent exploits in Manila.

Cast
 Cheri Caffaro as Samantha Fox
 Aharon Ipalé as Domingo De La Torres
 Vic Diaz as Sanchez
 Corinne Calvet as Madame Ruanda
 John Van Dreelen as MacKenzie Portman (as John vanDreelen)
 Jordan Rosengarten as Justin Stockwell
 Butz Aquino as Carlos Rossimo
 Subas Herrero as Octavio Calderone
 Grace Lee as Miss Chow
 Paquito Salcedo as Lu Chang
 Vic Silayan as District Attorney
 Joonee Gamboa as Mr. Bulacon (as June Gamboa)

References

External links
 

1977 films
1970s action films
1970s exploitation films
Films scored by Hugo Montenegro
Films set in the Philippines
Films shot in the Philippines
1970s English-language films
American exploitation films
American spy action films
1970s American films